Zodarion nigriceps is a spider species found in Corsica and Sardinia.

See also 
 List of Zodariidae species

References

External links 

nigriceps
Spiders of Europe
Spiders described in 1873